Mary Eileen McDonnell (born April 28, 1952) is an American film, stage, and television actress. She received Academy Award nominations for her roles as Stands With A Fist in Dances with Wolves and May-Alice Culhane in Passion Fish. McDonnell is well known for her performances as President Laura Roslin in Battlestar Galactica, First Lady Marilyn Whitmore in Independence Day, and Rose in Donnie Darko. She was featured as Captain Sharon Raydor during seasons 5–7 of the TNT series The Closer and starred as Commander Sharon Raydor in the spin-off series Major Crimes on the same network.

Early life 
Mary Eileen McDonnell was born April 28, 1952, in Wilkes-Barre, Pennsylvania, one of six children born to Eileen (née Mundy) and John "Jack" McDonnell, a computer consultant. She is of Irish descent and was raised Roman Catholic. As a child, McDonnell relocated with her family to Ithaca, New York, where she spent the remainder of her upbringing.

After graduating from the State University of New York at Fredonia, she attended drama school and joined the Long Wharf Theatre in New Haven, Connecticut, where she worked for three months. McDonnell's father died when she was 21 years old.

Career 
McDonnell appeared off-Broadway in two separate productions of Buried Child in 1978 and 1979, both times in the role of "Shelly". She won an Obie Award for Best Actress in 1981 for her work in the play Still Life. On Broadway, she has performed in productions of Execution of Justice, The Heidi Chronicles, and Summer and Smoke.

After more than 21 years of theater and television work, McDonnell made her film breakthrough in 1990 as the daughter of American settlers raised by Sioux Indians named Stands with a Fist in Kevin Costner's Dances with Wolves. Portraying the adopted daughter of Graham Greene's character Kicking Bird, McDonnell, then 37, was only 10 months younger than Greene and less than two years younger than Tantoo Cardinal, who played Black Shawl, her adoptive mother. She was nominated for an Academy Award for Best Supporting Actress for the role.

McDonnell's role in Passion Fish (1992) brought her another Academy Award nomination, this time for Best Actress in a Leading Role. Her other notable films include Grand Canyon (1991), Sneakers (1992), Independence Day (1996), and Donnie Darko (2001). McDonnell also starred with Patrick Swayze in the 1988 movie, Tiger Warsaw. In 1997, she played the judge in the film 12 Angry Men.

On television, McDonnell had her first regular part in 1980 on the soap opera As the World Turns. She starred in 1984 on the short-lived CBS medical comedy E/R. Coincidentally, she guest-starred in 2001 on the NBC medical series of the same name ER. She was nominated for an Emmy Award for her role on the show as Eleanor Carter. She played Dr. Virginia Dixon, a surgeon with Asperger syndrome for three episodes of Grey's Anatomy in 2008 and 2009.

In 2003, McDonnell starred in the miniseries  Battlestar Galactica as Laura Roslin. The miniseries led to the weekly series, with McDonnell's reprising her Laura Roslin role. The series ended in March 2009. McDonnell received worldwide recognition for her performance in the show, part of which was shown when she was invited to the United Nations for a retrospective and discussion with Edward James Olmos (Admiral Adama).

McDonnell took part in a special session entitled Battlestar Galactica at the 2009 World Science Festival. The session also included Michael Hogan, as well as scientists Nick Bostrom and Kevin Warwick.

In 2011, she appeared in the role of Kate Roberts, the mother of Emma Roberts's character in Scream 4.

From 2009 to 2012, McDonnell had a recurring role in The Closer as Capt. Sharon Raydor, a police captain in the Force Investigation Division, who often butts heads with Kyra Sedgwick's Golden Globe and Emmy award-winning character. McDonnell received an Emmy nomination for Outstanding Guest Actress in a Drama Series in 2011 for the role.

After The Closer wrapped up its final season 2012, McDonnell's character continued as the lead in the spin-off, Major Crimes, which debuted August 13, 2012  and finally finished in  January 2018.

Personal life 
McDonnell was married to actor Randle Mell. They have two children, Michael and Olivia. The couple separated in December 2021.

Filmography

Film

Television

Awards and nominations

References

External links 
 
 
 

1952 births
Living people
20th-century American actresses
21st-century American actresses
Actors from Wilkes-Barre, Pennsylvania
Actresses from New York (state)
Actresses from Pennsylvania
American film actresses
American people of Irish descent
American stage actresses
American television actresses
Catholics from New York (state)
People from Ithaca, New York
State University of New York at Fredonia alumni
Western (genre) film actresses
Ithaca High School (Ithaca, New York) alumni